The 1992 FIFA Futsal World Championship was the second FIFA Futsal World Championship, the quadrennial international futsal championship contested by the men's national teams of the member associations of FIFA. It was held between 15 and 28 November 1992 in Hong Kong. It was the first FIFA tournament held in the country.

Brazil won the tournament for the second consecutive time.

Qualifying criteria

Qualified nations 

1 Qualified for the tournament, but was ejected due to the Yugoslav Wars.

Venues

Squads 

Each nation submitted a squad of 12 players, including two goalkeepers.

Officials

Draw 
The 16 teams were divided in four groups, each group with four teams.

First round

Group A

Group B

Group C

Group D

Second round

Group E

Group F

Third Round

Semifinals

Third Place

Final

Champions

Awards

Tournament ranking

External links
FIFA Futsal World Championship Hong Kong 1992, FIFA.com
FIFA Technical Report

 
FIFA Futsal World Cup
Fifa Futsal World Championship, 1992
International association football competitions hosted by Hong Kong
world